Albele River may refer to the following rivers in Romania:

 Albele, a tributary of the Jaleș in Gorj County
 Albele, an alternative name for Lupul River (Tazlău) in Bacău County

See also 
 Albac River (disambiguation)
 Albești River (disambiguation)
 Râul Alb (disambiguation)
 Izvorul Alb River (disambiguation)